Bernardo de' Medici (died 1519) was an Italian Roman Catholic prelate who served as Bishop of Forlì (1516–1519).

Biography
On 15 Nov 1516, Bernardo de' Medici was appointed during the papacy of Pope Julius II as Bishop of Forlì.
He served as Bishop of Forlì until his death in 1519.

References

External links 
 (for Chronology of Bishops) 
 (for Chronology of Bishops)  

16th-century Italian Roman Catholic bishops
Bishops appointed by Pope Julius II
1519 deaths
Bishops of Forlì